Andrew Foreshew-Cain ( Andrew Cain) is a Church of England chaplain of Lady Margaret Hall at the University of Oxford.

He married his partner of 14 years, Steve Foreshew, in 2014. He was the first Anglican vicar and second priest to be in a same-sex marriage, despite the Church of England's opposition.

Although he kept his position at St Mary with All Souls in Kilburn, and St James' in West Hampstead, after his wedding, he was blacklisted from getting another job within the Church, after he resigned as priest and member of the General Synod in 2017, citing institutional homophobia within the Church as his reason for leaving.

Because of his marriage, the Archbishop of Canterbury, Justin Welby, did not want him to become chaplain of Lady Margaret Hall at the University of Oxford; however, he was given the role in 2019 by Alan Rusbridger, the former Guardian editor-in-chief, and was allowed to take it as appointments at Oxford colleges operate outside the Church's jurisdiction, meaning the appointment cannot be blocked by bishops.

He is the co-founder of Equal, the Campaign for Equal Marriage in the Church of England, a group which is calling for the CofE to accept same-sex marriages. He also defended fellow gay vicar Jarel Robinson-Brown, who described "a cult of white British nationalism" surrounding a nationwide clap for Captain Tom Moore following his death, telling The Observer: "What Jarel tweeted was actually very respectful of Captain Tom, but he raised questions about some of those lionising him. There has been a pile-on in response, and the church has aided that."

References

Living people
21st-century English Anglican priests
LGBT Anglican clergy
Year of birth missing (living people)
21st-century LGBT people